Klestyata is a rural locality (a village) in Lobanovskoye Rural Settlement, Permsky District, Perm Krai, Russia. The population was 179 as of 2010. There are 4 streets.

Geography 
Klestyata is located 21 km southeast of Perm (the district's administrative centre) by road. Malye Klestyata is the nearest rural locality.

References 

Rural localities in Permsky District